Carmine Gorga (born December 8, 1935) is an Italian political scientist naturalized American working as President of The Somist Institute.

Life and career

Born in Roccadaspide (Salerno), during the great depression in Southern Italy. He was born on December 8, 1935. Came to the United States in 1965. Gorga left Italy to continue his study of The Political Thought of Louis D. Brandeis, the subject of his PhD dissertation at the University of Naples in 1959. This work earned him a Council of Europe Scholarship that led him to the Bologna Center of the Johns Hopkins’ School of Advanced International Studies (SAIS) in 1961 and the following year, thanks to a Fulbright Scholarship, to the Johns Hopkins’ SAIS in Washington, DC, where he received an MA in International Relations. Among other positions, he is currently the president of The Somist Institute.
He married Joan R. Mohr in 1969; they have one son, Jonathan.
He is a Third Order Carmelite.

Education and scholarship
Gorga received many scholarships in addition to the Council of Europe Scholarship and scholarship from Johns Hopkins which brought him to America for study. Carmine Gorga earned his Ph.D. in Political Science at the University of Naples, Italy in 1959 and earned a diploma in International Relations, Bologna Center of the Johns Hopkins University in 1961. He also earned an MA in International Relations from Johns Hopkins' School of Advanced International Studies (SAIS) in Washington, D.C., 1962.

Gorga's scholarly papers and 2002 book, "The Economic Process: An Instantaneous Non-Newtonian Picture," challenged the linear world of economics by introducing concepts of relational analysis and interdisciplinary collaboration which he calls Concordian Economics.

Books
Gorga, Carmine (2002 and 2010).The economic process: An instantaneous non-Newtonian Picture. Lanham, Md. and Oxford: University Press of America.
Gorga, Carmine (2008).To My Polis, With Love: May Gloucester Show the World the Ways of Frugality, Gloucester, MA: The Somist Institute.
Gorga, Carmine (2014).A Case for God: In Search of a Humanism Filled with True Human Beings, Gloucester, MA: The Somist Institute.

See also
 Relationalism
 Joseph Kaipayil
 Raj Bhala
 Being
 Alfred North Whitehead

References

External links
 
 www.concordians.org
 www.polis-tics.com
 www.gloucestercdc.org
 www.relationalism.net
 www.TheGreatCalmOrganization.org

American business theorists
Italian economists
Italian anti-fascists
Italian business theorists
Italian emigrants to the United States
Corporate finance theorists
Neo-Keynesian economists
People from Salerno
People from Gloucester, Massachusetts
1935 births
Living people
Economists from Massachusetts